Francesco Indirli (born 27 September 1987 in San Pietro Vernotico, Italy) is an Italian footballer who plays as a defender. He is currently unattached.

External links
 Francesco Indirli's profile on San Marino Calcio's official website

1987 births
Italian footballers
Living people
Manfredonia Calcio players
A.S.D. Victor San Marino players

Association football defenders